Sons of Hollywood is an American reality show starring Randy Spelling (son of Aaron Spelling), Sean Stewart (son of British rocker Rod Stewart), and agent David Weintraub.

Overview
The show follows Randy Spelling, Sean Stewart, and their agent David Weintraub. In the show, Spelling and Stewart live together.

Episodes

References

External links
  
 A&E's Sons of Hollywood website

2007 American television series debuts
2007 American television series endings
2000s American reality television series
A&E (TV network) original programming
English-language television shows
Television shows set in Los Angeles
Television shows set in Miami